James Cumming (1922–1991) was a Scottish painter and lecturer influential in The Edinburgh School in the post-war period.

Biography
Cumming was born in Dunfermline, Scotland, in 1922. He was educated at Dunfermline High School and Edinburgh College of Art, where he lectured until the early 1980s. At the school he was remembered as a serious student who strove for the best results in everything he did. He showed early promise in music, excelling in piano and winning distinction at every grade. His artistic talents were nurtured at school by the teacher and artist George Watson.

He displayed an early determination to become an artist, winning an Andrew Grant Scholarship to attend the Edinburgh College of Art between 1939 and 1947, but his studies were interrupted by the Second World War. In 1941 he joined the Royal Air Force, completed pilot training at Terrell, Texas, in 1944 and served in RAF Transport Command in India and Burma. 

Returning to his studies he completed his Diploma in 1948 and his postgraduate degree in 1949. He was awarded a Travelling Scholarship, which he used to live and work in the remote island community of Callanish on the Isle of Lewis, Scotland. He created a series of paintings, known as the Hebridean paintings, during this period that later helped to establish Cumming, broadly speaking, as painter of The Edinburgh School.

Cumming's work was included in the Scottish Gallery retrospective exhibition in 1993 entitled The Edinburgh School. This exhibition also showed the works of Robin Philipson and William Gillies, both of whom were close artistic and academic associates of Cumming.

Teaching
Cumming lectured at the Edinburgh College of Art between 1950 and 1982, teaching both in the Humanities and the Painting school. Students of this time included Sandy Moffat, John Bellany and latterly Richard Wright who won the Turner Prize in 2009. Cumming is remembered with great affection for his gentlemanly encouragement, sparkling wit and the range of his intellect. He was elected Academian of the Royal Scottish Academy in 1970 and acted as its Secretary between 1978 and 1980.

Family
He married the artist Betty Elston in 1953 and their marriage continued until his death in 1991. He was survived by Betty, his son Timothy Cumming, entrepreneur and artist, and daughter Laura Cumming, art critic of The Observer newspaper.

His art
The two principal periods in Cumming's painting are the figurative abstraction of the early sixties derived in main part from his Lewis experience and the more geometrical and purer abstraction of the seventies onwards. The "painterly" yet thinly applied textures of Cumming's early work contrasts with the heavy impasto and rich colour themes of his contemporaries in the Edinburgh School. His later colour experimentations were to be as much intellectual as expressive, leading to a deeper synthesis of harmony and contrast. A strong element of fine draughtsmanship is a constant throughout Cumming's work.

Cumming's position in post-war Scottish art is perhaps best summed up by the art critic Duncan Macmillan in 1994: "Cumming and Philipson were ambitious artists who strove to create a genuinely original vision; others achieved as much reputation with less struggle".

The work of Scottish artist Alan Davie, who has achieved an International reputation, and was a contemporary of Cumming, has given rise to many interesting comparisons. This was succinctly put by the critic and artist Edward Gage in 1977: "Cumming's language is drawn logically from scientific research and procedure while Davie's is a haphazard and personal affair of ritual symbols and dances".

Aside from a series of carefully composed still lifes, many of Cumming's later works were derived from investigations into recent discoveries with the electron microscope. This latter period has its apotheosis in the painting 'Metaphase' (Acceleration) 1971, which demonstrates Cummings exceptional abilities in composition, draughtsmanship and his acute colour sensitivity.

Cumming's paintings, spanning a 30-year period, were celebrated most recently during an exhibition of his work at the Talbot Rice Gallery in Edinburgh.

Chronology
1922:     Born Dunfermline
1939–41:   Studied Edinburgh College of Art, Andrew Grant Scholar
1941–46:   Royal Air Force Volunteer Reserve
1950:	    Appointed Tutor in the Painting School, ECA.
1951:	    Royal Scottish Academy Award
1958–61:	President Society of Scottish Artists
1964:	    Awarded International Scholarship in the Humanities, Harvard USA
1966:	    Retrospective Exhibition, Dunfermline
1969–73: 	Member of the National Broadcasting Council for Scotland.
1970:		Elected Academician of the Royal Scottish Academy
1973–78:	Treasurer of the RSA
1974:		Member of the National Council for Academic Awards, London
1978–80:	Secretary of the RSA
1980:		Lothian Region Prize in the RSW Centenary Exhibition
1982:		Retired from Teaching
1990:		Saltire Society Award for mural The Community: A Festival of Time, Linlithgow

Further reading
	Firth, J., 1995. James Cumming. Edinburgh: Merkat Press
	Gage, E., 1977. The Eye in the Wind. Glasgow: Collins, p. 41
	Harris, P., and J. Halsby, 1990. The Dictionary of Scottish Painters. Edinburgh: Canongate, p. 48
	MacMillan, D., 1994. Scottish Art in the 20th Century. Edinburgh: Mainstream, p. 100
	Smith, B., and S. Skipwith, 2003. A History of Scottish Art. London: Merrill, p. 195
	McEwan, P., 2004. The Dictionary of Scottish Art and Architecture. Aberdeen: Glengarden Press, p. 128

References

External links
 

1922 births
1991 deaths
20th-century Scottish painters
Scottish male painters
Edinburgh College of Art
Alumni of the Edinburgh College of Art
Royal Air Force pilots of World War II
Presidents of the Society of Scottish Artists
20th-century Scottish male artists